Saige tram stop is located on line  of the tramway de Bordeaux.

Location
The station is located on avenue Maréchal Juin in Pessac.

Junctions
 Buses of the TBC

Close by

See also
 TBC
 Tramway de Bordeaux

Bordeaux tramway stops
Tram stops in Pessac
Railway stations in France opened in 2004